The 2008 Tour of Missouri was the second annual edition of a professional road bicycle racing stage race held in Missouri. It began on September 8, 2008, with seven days of racing. Run by same organizers as the Tour de Georgia and the Amgen Tour of California, the Tour of Missouri is being billed as the third highest profile domestic race in the United States. The race was broadcast on Universal Sports, a network being carried on the digital subchannels of twenty-one television stations throughout the country.

Stage

Stage 1
8 September 2008 — Saint Joseph to Kansas City,

Stage 2
9 September 2008 — Clinton to Springfield,

Stage 3
10 September 2008 — Branson,  (Individual Time Trial)

Stage 4
11 September 2008 — Lebanon to Rolla,

Stage 5
12 September 2008 — St. James to Jefferson City,

Stage 6
13 September 2008 — Hermann to St. Charles,

Stage 7
14 September 2008 — St. Louis,

Jersey progress

Participating teams 
UCI ProTour Teams
 LIQ –  Team Liquigas
 THR –  Team Columbia

UCI Professional Continental Teams
 BMC –  BMC Racing Team
 TSL –  Garmin–Chipotle presented by H30

UCI Continental Teams—America Tour
 BPC –  Bissell Pro Cycling Team
 COL –  Colovita Sutter Home presented by Cooking Light
 HNM –  Health Net Pro Cycling Team Presented by Maxxis
 JBC –  Jelly Belly Cycling Team
 KBM –  Kelly Benefit Strategies / Medifast
 RRC –  Rock Racing
 SYM –  Symmetrics Cycling Team
 TUA –  Tecos de la Universidad de Guadalajara
 TUP –  Toyota–United Pro Cycling Team

UCI Continental Team—Europe Tour
 RB3 –  Rabobank
 TSP –  Team Sparkasse

References

External links
 Official Site

2008
Tour of Missouri
Missouri, Tour of
Tour of